The Brian Jonestown Massacre is an American musical project and band led by Anton Newcombe.

BJM may also refer to:

 Being John Malkovich, a 1999 American black comedy-fantasy film 
 "Big" John McCarthy
 Bujumbura International Airport (IATA code: BJM), an airport in Bujumbura (the former capital of Burundi)